The 1991–92 Ranji Trophy was the 58th season of the Ranji Trophy. Delhi won the final against Tamil Nadu.

Group stage

North Zone

West Zone

East Zone

South Zone

Central Zone

Knockout stage 

(F) - Advanced to next round / won the finals on First Innings Lead

Final

Scorecards and averages
Cricketarchive

References

External links
 Ranji Trophy 1991-92 at ESPNcricinfo

1992 in Indian cricket
Domestic cricket competitions in 1991–92
Ranji Trophy seasons